Shokhovka is a rural locality (a village) in Rognedinsky District, Bryansk Oblast, Russia. The population was 2 as of 2013. There is 1 street.

Geography 
Shokhovka is located 40 km north of Rognedino (the district's administrative centre) by road. Strecheya is the nearest rural locality.

References 

Rural localities in Rognedinsky District